The Georgia Radio Museum and Hall of Fame was a non-profit corporation that honored the men and women of radio broadcasting in the U.S. state of Georgia. It was founded in 2007.   The museum's LaGrange location closed in August 2020 due to lack of interest.  In 2021, the museum's physical collections were relocated to the Columbus Collective Museums in Columbus, Georgia.

See also
List of museums in Georgia (U.S. state)

References

External links

American radio awards
Science and technology halls of fame
Halls of fame in Georgia (U.S. state)
State halls of fame in the United States
History museums in Georgia (U.S. state)
Industry museums in Georgia (U.S. state)
Museums in Camden County, Georgia
Broadcast engineering
Radio organizations in the United States
St. Marys, Georgia
Awards established in 2007
Museums established in 2007
2007 establishments in Georgia (U.S. state)
Telecommunications museums in the United States